The Only Thing (also known under its working title Four Flaming Days) is a 1925 American silent romantic drama film starring Eleanor Boardman. The film's scenario was written by author Elinor Glyn (who also oversaw the film's production), and was based on a story adapted from Glyn's novel of the same name.

It was the first film Jack Conway directed for Metro-Goldwyn-Mayer where he remained for until his retirement in 1948.  The film is also notable for featuring a young Joan Crawford in her eighth film role playing a minor part as a lady in waiting.

Plot
As described in a review in a film magazine, a handsome and titled Englishman visits a Balkan kingdom and falls madly in love with a young princess who has come to marry the elderly, grouchy, and ugly king. He determines to save her even against her will and so daring and ardent is his lovemaking that she is about to consent when she determines that duty to the state comes first. A revolution occurs and the hero, when he finds that death has been decreed for all aristocrats, who are tied in pairs and send out to drown in leaky barges, contrives to be paired with her. A warship sent by her country saves them and they find happiness together.

Cast

Preservation
A complete print of The Only Thing is held in the George Eastman Museum Motion Picture Collection.

References

External links

Still with Joan Crawford

1925 films
1925 romantic drama films
American romantic drama films
American silent feature films
American black-and-white films
Films directed by Jack Conway
Metro-Goldwyn-Mayer films
American historical films
Films set in Europe
Romantic period films
1920s American films
Silent romantic drama films
Silent American drama films